Claudia Novelo (born August 9, 1965) is a retired Mexican competitor in women's synchronized swimming. She represented her native country at the 1984 Summer Olympics, and claimed the bronze medal in the women's duet at the 1983 Pan American Games in Caracas alongside Pilar Ramírez.

References

1965 births
Living people
Mexican synchronized swimmers
Olympic synchronized swimmers of Mexico
Synchronized swimmers at the 1984 Summer Olympics
Place of birth missing (living people)
Pan American Games bronze medalists for Mexico
Pan American Games medalists in synchronized swimming
Synchronized swimmers at the 1983 Pan American Games
Medalists at the 1983 Pan American Games